Mehlman is a surname. Notable people with the surname include: 

 Jeffrey Mehlman, literary critic and historian of ideas
 Ken Mehlman, chair of the US Republican National Committee
 Peter Mehlman, television writer and producer

See also
 Melman

Surnames